The Houjie Mosque or Black Street Mosque is a mosque in Qinzhou District, Tianshui City, Gansu, China.

See also
 Islam in China
 List of mosques in China

References

Mosques in Gansu
Major National Historical and Cultural Sites in Gansu
Tianshui